Chamacoco is a Zamucoan language spoken in Paraguay by the Chamacoco people. It is also known as Xamicoco or Xamacoco, although the tribe itself prefers the name  Ishír, which is also spelled Ishiro or Jewyo. When the term Ishiro (or yshyro or ɨshɨro) is used to refer to the language, it is an abbreviation for Ishir(o) ahwoso, literally meaning 'the words, the language of the Chamacoco people'. It is spoken by a traditionally hunter-gatherer society that now practices agriculture. Its speakers are of all ages, and generally do not speak Spanish or Guarani well.

Classification
Chamacoco is classified as a Zamucoan language, along with Ayoreo. Both languages are considered endangered.  There is relatively little information about the Zamucoan family. 

Chamacoco speakers live in the northeastern part of the Chaco Boreal at the origin of the Río Verde in Paraguay. Four dialects of Chamacoco have been identified: Héiwo, in the Fuerte Olimpo area; Ebidóso and Hório, spoken in the Bahía Negra region; and Tomaráho, in the Alto Paraná Atlantic forests.

The speakers of Hório and Ebidóso were estimated to be 800 in 1970. Fewer than 200 people spoke Tomaráho then. Back in 1930, over 2000 people were estimated to speak Chamacoco.

Verb inflection is based on personal prefixes and the language is tenseless. For example, chɨpɨrme teu dosh means "the kingfisher eats fish", while chɨpɨra teu wichɨ dosht means "the kingfisher will eat fish." Nouns can be divided into possessable and non-possessable. Possessable nouns are characterized by a prefixation whereby the noun agrees with the possessor or genitival modifier. There is no difference between nouns and adjectives in suffixation. The syntax is characterized by the presence of para-hypotactical structures. The comparison of inflectional morphology has shown remarkable similarities with Ayoreo and Ancient Zamuco.

A Chamacoco Talking Dictionary was produced by Living Tongues Institute for Endangered Languages.

Phonology

Vowels 

All vowels except for /ɑ, ə/ have nasalized forms.

Consonants

Sample words and phrases
 matah debich (IPA: a debitʃ) – finger
 aap (IPA: ap) – fox/lion cub
 tɨkɨn chɨp owa (IPA: tɪgɪ ʃebɔa) – thank you very much
 ich amatak (IPA: ɪdʒ amaɹtɔk) – he eats a lot
 ye takmape (IPA: je taɣmabe) – he does not eat a lot
 tɨkɨya oyetɨke (IPA: tɪkija ɔɪhetɪgɪ) – I bought a dog for you
 yok (IPA: jɔk) – I
 ich takaha (IPA: i taɣaha) – I go

References

External links

Chamacoco Talking Dictionary
Sorosoro Project
ELAR archive of Documentation of the Tomarâho variety of Chamacoco, Paraguay

Zamucoan languages
Languages of Paraguay
Chaco linguistic area